Government Post Graduate College Noida
() is a Government College situated in Sector-39, Noida, Uttar Pradesh. This college  is affiliated to Chaudhary Charan Singh University.

References

External links
Official website

Postgraduate colleges in Uttar Pradesh
Universities and colleges in Noida
Educational institutions established in 1982
1982 establishments in Uttar Pradesh
Chaudhary Charan Singh University